Michael James Jacobs (born October 30, 1980) is an American former professional baseball first baseman. He played in Major League Baseball (MLB) for the New York Mets, Florida Marlins, Kansas City Royals, and Arizona Diamondbacks.

Career

Minor Leagues 
Mike Jacobs graduated from Hilltop High School in Chula Vista and spent one season at Grossmont College in El Cajon, California before being selected by the New York Mets in the 38th round of the 1999 Major League Baseball Draft.

Originally signed as a catcher, Jacobs batted .333 with four home runs and 30 runs batted in his first professional season with the Gulf Coast League Mets.

In May , while playing for the Triple-A Norfolk Tides, Jacobs suffered an arm injury and underwent surgery for a torn labrum, which ended his season prematurely. He batted .321 with 25 home runs and 93 RBIs while learning his new position and going on to win the MVP award.

On December 18, 2010, Jacobs was signed by the Colorado Rockies  and played for the affiliate triple-A team in Colorado Springs, Colorado. While there, Jacobs was suspended for fifty games after testing positive for HGH. Jacobs was released from the Colorado Rockies on August 18, 2011.

New York Mets 
Jacobs made his major league debut with the Mets on August 21, hitting a three-run pinch-hit home run against Esteban Loaiza of the Washington Nationals in his first ever Major League at-bat. Jacobs rather instantly assumed the position of everyday first baseman and continued to hit, tallying four home runs through three games, during the Mets' 4-game drubbing of the Arizona Diamondbacks. During this stretch the Mets were able to pull within a half-game of the National League Wild Card lead, but faded quickly, dropping two straight games at home to the Philadelphia Phillies and promptly falling out of the race. Jacobs continued to play well, increasing his stock as a trade chip by slugging a monstrous .710 in his five weeks as a major leaguer.

Florida Marlins 
In only 30 games and 100 at-bats, Jacobs hit an impressive 11 home runs and 23 RBI. Many people penciled him in as the Mets' first baseman for the  season. However, on November 23, 2005, the Mets traded him and a minor league pitcher, Yusmeiro Petit, to the Florida Marlins in exchange for Carlos Delgado and $7 million.

In 2006 with the Marlins, Jacobs played in 136 games while hitting .262 with 20 home runs and 77 RBIs. In 2007, he only played in 114 games, but still improved on his batting average hitting .265 that season including 17 home runs and 54 RBIs. In 2008 Jacobs saw increased playing time and had a break out season in power with 32 home runs and 93 RBI but his batting average slipped to .247.

Kansas City Royals 
After the  season, Jacobs was traded to the Kansas City Royals for pitcher Leo Núñez. While initially thought to split time at first base with Billy Butler, he was mostly the team's DH due to inconsistent play on the field. Following the season, Jacobs was released by the Royals on December 10.

Return to New York 

On February 10, 2010 the Mets signed Mike Jacobs to a minor league contract. He was selected as the Mets' opening day first baseman after Daniel Murphy went on the disabled list with a strained MCL.

On April 18, Jacobs was designated for assignment.

On April 25, 2010 Jacobs cleared waivers and accepted assignment to the AAA Buffalo Bisons of the International League.

Toronto Blue Jays 
On July 30, 2010, he was acquired by the Toronto Blue Jays for a player to be named later. He was released at the end of the 2010 season.

Colorado Rockies 
Jacobs signed as a minor league free agent with the Colorado Rockies on December 18, 2010.

On August 18, 2011, while playing for the AAA Colorado Springs Sky Sox, Jacobs was suspended for 50 games after testing positive for Human Growth Hormone. In response, Jacobs was released by the Rockies.

Arizona Diamondbacks 
On January 4, 2012, Jacobs signed a minor league contract with the Arizona Diamondbacks. On September 19, he was called up and played his first Major League game since April 17, 2010.

Seattle Mariners 
On January 3, 2013, Jacobs signed a minor league contract with the Seattle Mariners.
On March 23, 2013, he was released along with veteran starting pitcher Jon Garland.

Second Stint with Arizona 
On June 4, 2013, the D'backs signed Jacobs back to a minor league deal. Jacobs had been playing in the Mexican League. Jacobs returned to AAA Reno for the 2014 season. He participated in the AAA Home Run Derby that same year.

Guerreros de Oaxaca 
On March 26, 2015, it was reported that Jacobs had signed on to return to play for the Guerreros de Oaxaca of the Mexican League.

Lancaster Barnstormers
On March 25, 2016, Jacobs signed with the Lancaster Barnstormers.

Toros de Tijuana
On May 3, 2016, Jacobs signed with the Toros de Tijuana of the Mexican Baseball League.

Minor League Baseball manager
Jacobs retired after 2016 season and was hired by the Miami Marlins to manage their Class A Short-Season Batavia Muckdogs. Jacobs will manage the Clinton LumberKings of the Midwest League in 2019. For the 2021 season Jacobs will manage the Beloit Snappers.

Personal life
Jacobs got married in December 2006 and resides in Chula Vista during the baseball offseason. He has four daughters, Havana, Isabella, Sophia and Juliana.

Contrary to popular belief, Jacobs is not Jewish. This small detail was apparently not known to the Marlins when, on May 28, 2006, as part of the team's Jewish Heritage Day promotion, they gave Jacobs T-shirts to young fans who attended the game.

See also

List of Major League Baseball players with a home run in their first major league at bat

References

External links

, or Retrosheet
Pelota Binaria

1980 births
Living people
Águilas de Mexicali players
Águilas del Zulia players
American expatriate baseball players in Mexico
American sportspeople in doping cases
Arizona Diamondbacks players
Baseball coaches from California
Baseball players from California
Binghamton Mets players
Brooklyn Cyclones players
Buffalo Bisons (minor league) players
Capital City Bombers players
Carolina Mudcats players
Colorado Springs Sky Sox players
Florida Marlins players
Guerreros de Oaxaca players
Grossmont Griffins baseball players
Gulf Coast Mets players
Jupiter Hammerheads players
Kansas City Royals players
Kingsport Mets players
Las Vegas 51s players
Lancaster Barnstormers players
Major League Baseball first basemen
Mexican League baseball first basemen
Minor league baseball managers
Mesa Solar Sox players
New York Mets players
Norfolk Tides players
Pastora de los Llanos players
American expatriate baseball players in Venezuela
Peoria Saguaros players
Reno Aces players
Sportspeople from Chula Vista, California
St. Lucie Mets players
Toros de Tijuana players
Venados de Mazatlán players